Virginia Inman Postrel (born January 14, 1960) is an American political and cultural writer of broadly libertarian, or classical liberal, views. She is a recipient of the Bastiat Prize (2011).

Early life and education 
Virginia Inman was born and raised in Greenville, South Carolina. Her father was an engineer, while her mother was a homemaker turned English professor, returning to school to pursue a Master's degree while Virginia was in high school. Inman graduated from Princeton University in 1982 with an A.B. in English literature.

Career
Postrel was editor-in-chief of Reason from July 1989 to January 2000, and remained on the masthead as editor-at-large through 2001. Prior to that, she was a reporter for Inc. and the Wall Street Journal. She currently serves on the board of directors of the Foundation for Individual Rights in Education (FIRE). From 2000 to 2006, she wrote an economics column for the New York Times and from 2006 to 2009 she wrote the "Commerce and Culture" column for The Atlantic. She also appeared on the last episode of the third season of Penn and Teller's Bullshit!.

Postrel wrote the biweekly column "Commerce & Culture" for the Wall Street Journal until April 2011. Since May 2011, she has written a biweekly column for Bloomberg View.

She is best known for her non-fiction books including The Future and Its Enemies and The Substance of Style. In the former she explains her philosophy, "dynamism", a forward-looking and change-seeking philosophy that generally favors unregulated organization through "spontaneous order". She contrasts it with "stasis", a philosophy that favors top-down control and regulation and is marked by desire to maintain the present state of affairs. In November 2013, she published a third book, The Power of Glamour, which defined glamour as "nonverbal rhetoric" that "leads us to feel that the life we dream of exists, and to desire it even more." And, in November 2020, she published her fourth book, The Fabric of Civilization. This book looks at the "history of innovation, science, technology, trade, and human history in general" through the lens of the global development of textiles.

Health care, bioethics, and aesthetics
Postrel has written several articles on health care and bioethics, including accounts of her own experiences.

In March 2006 Postrel donated a kidney to an acquaintance, writer Sally Satel. She has recounted the experience, and referred to it in several subsequent articles and blog posts, many of which are critical of legal prohibitions against compensating organ donors. In some of the pieces, she discusses strategies for working around these restrictions, such as organ donor transplant chains.

In her March 2009 article "My Drug Problem" in The Atlantic, Postrel wrote about her own experience of being treated for breast cancer with the expensive drug Herceptin. She questioned if such a costly treatment would be available to others and if the risky research that makes such innovative treatments possible would be profitable under the proposed health care reforms in the United States.

Postrel has also referred to her experience as a cancer patient in her writing about the importance of design aesthetics in hospitals and the competitive forces that drive them to create more attractive environments for patients. This ties into the thesis of her second book, that beauty is more than simply a superficial, frivolous trait and can go more than skin deep. Notions of beauty and desirability, and thoughts on what makes good design good beyond the needs of sound engineering, informed her work at the "Deep Glamour" blog.

See also
 List of notable organ transplant donors and recipients

Bibliography
 
 The Future and Its Enemies: The Growing Conflict Over Creativity, Enterprise, and Progress, Free Press, (December 1, 1998)
 The Substance of Style: How the Rise of Aesthetic Value Is Remaking Commerce, Culture, and Consciousness, HarperCollins, September 2003
 The Power of Glamour: Longing and the Art of Visual Persuasion, Simon & Schuster, November 5, 2013
 The Fabric of Civilization: How Textiles Made the World, Basic Books, November 10, 2020

References

External links
 
 
 
 2004 TEDTalk "On glamour" TED Conference
 Video discussion/dialogue with Virginia Postrel and Dan Drezner on Bloggingheads.tv

1960 births
Living people
American bloggers
American columnists
American feminist writers
American libertarians
American magazine editors
Women magazine editors
American political writers
Individualist feminists
Organ transplant donors
21st-century American non-fiction writers
21st-century American women writers
20th-century American non-fiction writers
20th-century American women writers
American women non-fiction writers
Writers from Greenville, South Carolina